Richard Bucher (September 27, 1955 – September 7, 2012) was an ice hockey goaltender who played for HC Davos in the Swiss National League A.  He also represented the Switzerland men's national ice hockey team in the 1985 and 1987 World Championships as well as the 1988 Winter Olympics.

External links

1955 births
2012 deaths
HC Davos players
Ice hockey players at the 1988 Winter Olympics
Olympic ice hockey players of Switzerland
Sportspeople from Lucerne
Swiss ice hockey goaltenders